The 2008 Campbell Fighting Camels football team represented Campbell University in the 2008 NCAA Division I FCS football season as a member of the Pioneer Football League (PFL). The 2008 season was the first in which Campbell fielded a team. The Fighting Camels were led by head coach Dale Steele and played their home games at Barker–Lane Stadium. Campbell  finished the season 1–10 overall and 0–8 in PFL play to place last.

Schedule

References

Campbell
Campbell Fighting Camels football seasons
Campbell Fighting Camels football